Cook, Welton & Gemmell was a shipbuilder based in Hull and Beverley, East Riding of Yorkshire. England. They built trawlers and other small ships.

History

Founding and move to Beverley 
The firm was founded in 1883 on South Bridge Road, Hull, on the Humber bank. The founding partners were William James Cook, Charles Keen Welton and William Gemmell. In 1901–1902 the business moved nine miles up the River Hull to a new yard at Grovehill, Beverley purchased from Cochrane, Hamilton & Cooper. The yard had been founded by Andrew Cochrane in 1884. It was one of the few shipyards that launched broadside.

Prosperity and decline 
The new yard initially produced trawlers and whalers with dredging of the River Hull allowing larger ships to be built. During both world wars it built large numbers of ships such as minesweepers and anti-submarine trawlers for the Royal Navy. Between the wars it consolidated its reputation as a builder of high quality trawlers and continued to prosper into the 1950s. In 1954 the shipyard employed 650 workers and built 15 vessels (including three minesweepers, four trawlers, and a tug), but by 1960 the workforce had declined to 600 and after struggling to find orders Cook, Welton & Gemmell built their last ship in 1962 and went into voluntary liquidation in 1963.

Changes of ownership 
The firm was taken over by Charles D. Holmes & Co in March 1963 and the company name changed to Beverley Shipbuilding and Engineering Co Ltd. C D Holmes was subsequently taken over in July 1973 by Drypool Group, which in turn went into liquidation in 1975. The yard was then taken over by Whitby Shipyard Ltd on 1 July 1976. That company changed its name to Phoenix Shipbuilders Ltd in December 1976 and had a receiver appointed in May 1977, resulting in the closure of the Beverley yard with nearly 180 redundancies. The site reverted to the ground landlords, Beverley Borough Council, and was later developed as the Acorn Industrial Estate.

Ships built by Cook, Welton & Gemmell

Naval vessels 

Isles-class trawlers

Ailsa Craig (T377), 1943    
Annet (T341), 1943
Arran (T06), 1941
Balta (T50), 1941
Benbecula (T379), 1944
Bern (T294), 1942
Blackbird (M15), 1943
Bressay (T214), 1942
Brora (T99), 1941
Bruray (T236), 1942
Bryher (T350), 1943
Calvay (T383), 1944
Colsay (T384), 1944
Crowlin (T380), 1944
Dabchick (M22), 1943
Egilsay (T215), 1942
Ensay (T216), 1942
Farne (T353), 1943
Flatholm (T354), 1943
Fuday (T385), 1944
Ganilly (T367), 1943
, 1943
Gweal (T246), 1942
Hannaray (T389), 1944
Harris (T386), 1944
Hascosay (T390), 1944
, 1942
Hildasay (T173), 1941
Hoxa (T16), 1941
Hoy (T114), 1941
Inchcolm (T18), 1941
Killegray (T174), 1941
Kittern (T382), 1943
Lindisfarne (T361), 1943
Lundy (T272), 1943
Mewstone (T374), 1943
Minalto (T362), 1943
Mull (T110), 1941
Neave (T247), 1942
Pladda (T144), 1941
Rosevean (T363), 1943
Sandray (T424), 1944
Scalpay (T237), 1942
Scaravay (J425), 1945
Scarba (T175), 1941
Sheppey (T292), 1942
Shillay (T426), 1945
Skokholm (T376), 1943
Stonechat (M25), 1944
Sursay (T427), 1945
Tahay (T452), 1945
Tocogay (T451), 1945
Trodday (T431), 1945
Ulva (T248), 1942
Vaceasay (T432), 1945
Vallay (T434), 1945
Whalsay (T293), 1942
Whitethroat (M03), 1944
Wiay (T441), 1945

Dance-class trawlers

Gavotte (T115), 1940
Hornpipe (T120), 1940

Tree-class trawlers

Birch (T93), 1940
Blackthorn (T100), 1940

Shakespearian-class trawlers
Hamlet (T167), 1940
, 1941
, 1941
Laertes (T137), 1941
Hill-class trawlers

Birdlip (T218), 1941
, 1942
Butser (T219), 1942
Duncton (T220), 1942
Dunkery (T224), 1942
Inkpen (T225), 1942
Portsdown (T221), 1942
Yes Tor (T222), 1942

Military-class trawlers

Bombardier (T304), 1943
Coldstreamer (T337), 1943
Fusilier (T305), 1943
Grenadier (T334), 1943
Guardsman (T393), 1944
Home Guard (T394), 1944
Lancer (T335), 1943
Royal Marine (T395), 1944
Sapper (T336), 1942

ASW trawlers requisitioned before completion
, 1940
Flower-class corvettes
, 1941
, 1941
Ton-class minesweepers

Brinton (M1114), 1954
, 1954
Chilton (M1215), 1958
Darlaston (M1127), 1954
Dilston (M1142), 1955
Hazleton (M1142), 1954
Hexton (M1143), 1955
Penston (M1169), 1955
Picton (M1170), 1956
Wilkieston (M1192), 1957

Castle-class trawlers

Ordered during First World War but completed after the war as commercial vessels

Andrew Anderson (FY4405), 1920
Andrew Apsley (FY4298), 1919
Charles Antram (FY4401), 1920
Charles Boyes (FY3593), 1918
Dominick Addison (FY4296), 1919
Egilias Akerman (FY4294), 1919
Frederick Bush (FY3594), 1918
George Adgell (FY4402), 1920
George Aiken (FY4291), 1920
George Cochran (FY3721), 1918
Griffith Griffith (FY3780), 1919
Isaac Arthan (FY4297), 1920
John Aikenhead (FY4292), 1919
John Ashley (FY4293), 1919
John Baptish (FY3596), 1918
John Bateman (FY3599), 1918
John Bomkworth (FY3597), 1918
John Gauntlet (FY3779), 1919
John Graham (FY3778), 1919
John Gulipster (FY3782), 1919
Joseph Barratt (FY3586), 1918
Joseph Button (FY3584), 1918
Joshua Arabin (FY4299), 1919
Michael Griffith (FY3781), 1919
Patrick Bowe (FY3591), 1918
Peter Blumberry (FY3583), 1918
Philip Godby (FY3783), 1919
Phineas Beard (FY3588), 1918
, 1918
Richard Crofts (FY3720), 1918
Robert Bowen (FY3595), 1918
Thomas Adney (FY4295), 1919
Thomas Alexander (FY4404), 1920
Thomas Allen (FY4403), 1920
Thomas Altoft (FY4300), 1920
Thomas Bartlett (FY3598), 1918
Thomas Booth (FY3592), 1918
Thomas Boudige (FY4406), 1920
Thomas Connolly (FY3589), 1918
William Bell (FY3590), 1918
William Brady (FY3585), 1918
William Browis (FY3582), 1918
William Caldwell (FY3719), 1918
William Darnold (FY3722), 1918

Castle-class trawlers (non-standard)

George Aunger (FY3611), 1918
Hugh Black (FY3602), 1917
James Berry (FY3603), 1917
John Anderson (FY3610), 1917
John Brennan (FY3609), 1918
John Brice (FY3608), 1918
John Brooker (FY3605), 1917
John Burlingham (FY3600), 1917
Richard Bagley (FY3604), 1917
Robert Betson (FY3601), 1917
Thomas Blackthorn (FY3606), 1917
Thomas Buckley (FY3607), 1917

Mersey-class trawlers (non-standard)
John Appleby (FY3612), 1917
John Arthur (FY3613), 1917
Kil-class patrol gunboats
Kilchattan (FY4013), 1918
Kilchvan (FY4014), 1918
Kilclief (FY4015), 1918
Kilclogher (FY4016), 1918

War Department vessels
Landsdowne, 1896
Moore, 1904
Osprey, 1895
Sir Redvers Buller, 1895

Fishing vessels 
Fishing trawlers

Port letter and number after name with year of building

Aby (FD138), 1945
Abydos (GY73), 1905
Achroite (H81), 1934
Active (H191), 1892
Admiral Hawke (H476), 1937
Advanturine (H197), 1930
Adventure (H1500), 1886
Akurey (RE95), 1947
Alamein (H123), 1950
Albatross, 1895
Alberta, 1910
Alderney (H273), 1895
Alert (H344), 1896
Alexandra (GY60), 1905
Alexandrite (H7), 1933
Alfred-Edith (O35), 1908
Almandine (H415), 1932
Amandine (H401), 1932
Amethyst (H455), 1928
Andalusite (H90), 1924
Andradite (H176), 1925
Andradite (H26), 1934
Angelo (H890), 1906
Anglia (GY254), 1890
Angus (H362), 1930
Anson (GY47), 1905
Aquamarine (H388), 1928
Arab (H516), 1933
Aracari (GY355), 1908
Aragonite (H79), 1934
Arctic Cavalier (H204), 1960
Arctic Corsair (H320), 1960
Arctic Hunter (H17), 1929
Arctic Ranger (H155), 1957
Arctic Vandal (H344), 1961
Argonaut (H291), 1895
Ariadne (H293), 1895
Ariel (H1473), 1885
Ariel (H843), 1905
Arkwright (H314), 1930
Artois (LR4049), 1947
Arum (CTA115), 1960
Asama (CF62), 1919
Athelstan (GY648), 1911
Athenian (GY357), 1903
Athenian (GY357), 1919
Auckland (H441), 1899
Aucuba (GY117), 1906
Aunis (LR4042), 1946
Avanturine (H197), 1930
Axinite (H183), 1925
Balthasar (H405), 1931
Barbados (GY71), 1905
Bardolph (H296), 1911
Basque (H521), 1933
Bassanio (H732), 1904
Bassethound (H151), 1891
Basuto (H401), 1931
Belovar (GY109), 1899
Belovar (GY109), 1906
Bempton (H19), 1914
Benella (H132), 1958
Bengal (GY108), 1905
Bengal (H287), 1896
Bermuda (GY56), 1905
Bernicia (GY1215), 1901
Beverlac (H72), 1929
Bianca (H845), 1905
Birch (GY677), 1912
Blakkur (GY378), 1931
Blanche (H928), 1907
Bloodhound (H89), 1890
Boadicea (H17), 1899
Boarhound (H125), 1891
Borella (H240), 1946
Borneo (GY115), 1905
Boston Seafire (H584), 1948
Bournemouth (H17), 1887
Breughel (O299), 1946
Breughel (O299), 1956
Brisbane (GY1281), 1903
Britannia (H1506), 1886
British Empire (H313), 1896
British Empire (H908), 1906
Briton (H538), 1901
Brontes (H41), 1934
Broxholme (H208), 1892
Brucella (H291), 1953
Buckhound (H143), 1891
Buffalo (GY52), 1905
Bulby (FD147), 1946
Bull Dog (H192), 1892
Bunsen (H269), 1926
Butterfly (H393), 1898
Cadet (H210), 1914
Cairo (H550), 1902
Calphurnia (GY495), 1909
Cambodia (GY597), 1911
Cambria (GY371), 1891
Cantatrice (GY469), 1915
Cape Adair (H119), 1956
Cape Barracouta (H267), 1930
Cape Columbia (H118 ), 1956
Cape Comorin (H291), 1936
Cape Otranto (H227), 1961
Cape Trafalgar (H59), 1957
Capel (H17), 1929
Capetown (H998), 1908
Cariama (GY4), 1904
Carieda (GY908), 1913
Cassandra (H848), 1905
Cayton Bay (H72), 1949
Celestial Empire (H371), 1897
Ceresio (H447), 1915
Ceylon (H103), 1890
Chalcedoney (H392), 1928
Chanticleer (H254), 1894
Chieftain (H847), 1905
Chindwin (H34), 1887
Christopher (H207), 1911
Chrysolite (H409), 1899
City of Birmingham (H162), 1891
City of Exeter (H256), 1894
City Of Gloucester (H298), 1895
City of Hull (H396), 1898
City of London (FD201), 1901
City of Wakefield (H132), 1891
Cleopatra (H46), 1899
Collingwood (GY1229), 1902
Commander Naismith (H385), 1915
Comrade (H348), 1896
Condor (GY85), 1905
Congo (GY274), 1897
Consort (GY498), 1909
Corientes (GY552), 1910
Cornelia (H257), 1894
Cornelian (H506), 1900
Corythaix (GY553), 1910
Councillor (H337), 1896
Courser (GY1287), 1904
Courser (GY79), 1905
Courtier (GY564), 1910
Courtland (GY35), 1904
Crusader (H5), 1904
Crystal (H303), 1895
Cuckoo (H309), 1896
Curlew (H274), 1895
Cyprus (H198), 1892
Cyrano (GY1203), 1900
Dale Castle (H195), 1892
Dane (GY403), 1897
Dane (H227), 1911
Davy (H322), 1936
De la Pole (H377), 1911
Deerhound (H81), 1889
Defender (GY1279), 1903
Delhi (H742), 1903
Dervish (H8), 1934
Desdemona (H535), 1901
Desideratum (H154), 1891
Destinn (GY307), 1914
Disa (CTA85), 1959
Dogberry (H46), 1909
Dogger Bank (H47), 1888
Donalda (GY149), 1914
Dorcas (H925), 1906
Douglas (H375), 1897
Douro (GY310), 1897
Dovey (GY425), 1897
Dromio (H102), 1910
Dromio (H94), 1929
Duchess of York (H227), 1893
Duke Of Wellington (H388), 1898
Duke Of York (H224), 1893
Durban (H378), 1897
Earl Essex (GY48), 1914
Earl Hereford (GY147), 1906
Earl Howard (GY332), 1914
Earl Kitchener (H345), 1915
Earl Lennox (GY367), 1914
Eastward Ho (H415), 1898
Edmond René, 1947
Edward B Cargill (H412), 1898
Edward Robson (H73), 1889
Edwardian (GY328), 1930
Edwardian (GY704), 1912
Egypt (H126), 1890
Eirikur Raudi (RE23), 1925
Electra (H1498), 1886
Electra (H661), 1904
Elk (GY1235), 1902
Ella Hewett (LO47), 1953
Embassy (GY469), 1928
Emperor (H741), 1903
Emu (H516), 1900
Encore (H523), 1900
Endymion (H519), 1900
Erin (H757), 1903
Ermine (H753), 1903
Eros (GY284), 1907
Eros (H768), 1903
Escallonia (GY631), 1911
Esmeralda (H747), 1903
Euclase (H384), 1931
Eudocia (H130), 1891
Excelsior (H70), 1889
Falcon (H321), 1896
Faraday (H366), 1897
Farnella (H41), 1948
Filey (H8), 1914
Flandre (GY598), 1915
Fleming (H3), 1929
Florence (H265), 1894
Fortuna (GY140), 1906
Forward (H407), 1898
Forward Ho (H331), 1914
Foxhound (H75), 1889
Franklin (H841), 1905
Fraser (H951), 1907
Freesia (GY633), 1911
Fulmar (H25), 1899
Fylkir (RE161), 1947
Fylkir (RE171), 1958
Gabir (GY497), 1909
Gadra (GY485), 1909
Galleon (GY269), 1930
Galvani (H88), 1929
Gambri (GY99), 1929
Gambri (GY992), 1916
Game Cock (H205), 1892
Gardar Thorsteinsson (GK3), 1948
Garu (GY644), 1911
Gaul  (H761), 1904
Gazehound (SD87), 1891
Geir (RE241), 1947
Gelsina (GY869), 1916
General Gordon (H3), 1899
General Roberts (H38), 1888
George (H216), 1893
George Irvin (CTA138), 1953
Gibraltar (H1000), 1908
Gibraltar (H119), 1890
Godanes (NK105), 1947
Gonzalo (H892), 1906
Good Hope (H722), 1903
Good Luck (H497), 1912
Goth (H211), 1925
Gozo (H545), 1902
Graphic (H78), 1889
Great Admiral (GY361), 1908
Grebe (GY219), 1906
Grecian (GY15), 1896
Grecian Empire (H479), 1899
Greyhound (H84), 1889
Grimsby, 1901
Gudmunder Juni (IS20), 1925
Guernsey (H271), 1895
Hannes Radherra (RE268), 1926
Harrier (H342), 1896
Hatsuse (CF61), 1919
Hawk (H389), 1898
Hawthorn (GY1228), 1902
Helios (GY784), 1903
Helvetia (GY767), 1898
Hene Castle (H414), 1898
Hercules (H771), 1903
Hero (H886), 1906
Heron (H135), 1891
Heron (H1489), 1886
Hirose (CF4), 1920
Honoria (H325), 1896
Hornsea (H485), 1899
Horus (GY691), 1899
Houbara (GY650), 1911
Howe (GY177), 1930
Hvalfell (RE282), 1947
Iago (H963), 1907
Ilustra (GY127), 1914
Imperial Queen (H357), 1897
Imperialist (H143), 1924
Imperialist (H143), 1924
Indian Empire (H 369), 1897
Industria (H14), 1887
Invicta (GY146), 1906
Iolanthe (H328), 1896
Iona (H709), 1904
Ireland (H351), 1897
Irrawaddy (H1479), 1885
Isborg (IS250), 1947
Isernia (GY164), 1899
Isis (GY75), 1899
Italia Caesar (GY442), 1937
Jacamar (GY649), 1911
Jacinth (H340), 1896
Jackdaw (H300), 1895
Jacques Colin (B2366), 1946
Jamaica (H317), 1896
James Carruthers (GY762), 1912
Jeria, 1899
Jeria (GY224), 1930
Jeria (GY985), 1916
Jessica (H870), 1906
Joannes Patursson, 1947
Johannesburg (H711), 1903
John Sherburn (H644), 1902
Jon Forseti (RE108), 1948
Josena (FD150), 1957
Josena (H207), 1945
Joseph Conrad (H161), 1957
Juliet (H880), 1906
K'Opanes (H502), 1930
Kastoria (GY1017), 1917
Kennymore (GY38), 1914
Kestrel (H318), 1896
Khartoum (H472), 1899
King Edward VII (H530), 1901
Kings Grey (GY486), 1915
Kingston Agate (H489), 1937
Kingston Alalite (H538), 1933
Kingston Amber (H326), 1960
Kingston Andalusite (H133), 1934
Kingston Beryl (H499), 1928
Kingston Cairngorm (H175), 1935
Kingston Cameo (H272), 1936
Kingston Ceylonite (H173), 1935
Kingston Chrysoberyl (H177), 1935
Kingston Chrysolite (H169), 1935
Kingston Coral (H241), 1930
Kingston Coral (H241), 1936
Kingston Cornelian (H75), 1934
Kingston Crystal (H281), 1936
Kingston Cyanite (H237), 1930
Kingston Cyanite (H254), 1936
Kingston Diamond (H294), 1926
Kingston Emerald, 1927
Kingston Emerald (H49), 1954
Kingston Galena (H31), 1934
Kingston Garnet (H106), 1949
Kingston Garnet (H323), 1927
Kingston Jacinth (H198), 1951
Kingston Jacinth (H44), 1929
Kingston Jade (H149), 1950
Kingston Jasper (H494), 1928
Kingston Olivine (H209), 1930
Kingston Onyx (H140), 1950
Kingston Onyx (H365), 1927
Kingston Pearl (H127), 1958
Kingston Pearl (H296), 1926
Kingston Peridot (H55), 1929
Kingston Peridot (H591), 1948
Kingston Sapphire (H39), 1929
Kingston Topaz (H145), 1927
Kingston Turquoise (H45), 1929
Kingston Turquoise (H50), 1955
Kingston Zircon (H108), 1949
Kingsway (GY37), 1905
Kirkella (H209), 1952
Kong Frederik III (F145), 1909
Kyoto (CF65), 1920
La Champagne (B2758), 1901
La Flandre, 1902
Labore Et Honore (H217), 1893
Labrador (H246), 1894
Laconia (GY1173), 1900
Lady Adelaide (H4), 1933
Lady Beryl (H222), 1935
Lady Beryl (H283), 1925
Lady Beryl (H283), 1925
Lady Eleanor (H50), 1929
Lady Enid (H172), 1929
Lady Hogarth (H479), 1937
Lady Jeanette (H466), 1937
Lady Lavinia (H160), 1935
Lady Lilian (H229), 1939
Lady Lillian (H467), 1933
Lady Madeleine (H243), 1939
Lady Madeleine (H279), 1926
Lady Madeline (H85), 1934
Lady Margot (H188), 1929
Lady Philomena (H230), 1936
Lady Rachael (H457), 1928
Lady Rosemary (H442), 1928
Lady Rosemary (H477), 1928
Lady Shirley (H464), 1937
Ladybird (H524), 1901
Ladysmith (H726), 1903
Lancella (H290), 1953
Lark (H1493), 1886
Lark (H359), 1897
Leonato (H41), 1909
Leonidas (H267), 1930
Linnet (H1495), 1886
Linnet (H363), 1897
Livingstone (H496), 1900
Loch Inver (H195), 1930
Loch Leven (A379), 1928
Loch Seaforth (H529), 1933
Lord Bradbury (H251), 1925
Lord C Beresford (H341), 1896
Lord Chancellor (H50), 1888
Lord Fisher (H264), 1914
Lord Jellicoe (H228), 1962
Lord Nelson (H345), 1897
Lord Rosebery (H537), 1901
Lord Salisbury (H702), 1902
Lord Selborne (GY1058), 1917
Lord St Vincent (H261), 1962
Lord Wolseley (H263), 1904
Lorella (H455), 1947
Lorenzo (H518), 1933
Lorinda (FD182), 1928
Loroone (GY830), 1913
Louis Botha (GY896), 1916
Loyal (GY501), 1929
Lucknow (H739), 1903
Lundy (H993), 1908
Lycurgus (H93), 1890
Lysander (H800), 1903
Macfarlane (H997), 1908
Mackenzie (H349), 1911
Mackenzie (H691), 1902
Mafeking (H716), 1903
Magpie (H311), 1896
Malabar (H754), 1903
Mandalay (H105), 1890
Marbella (H52), 1955
Marconi (H777), 1903
Margaret Wicks (FD265), 1948
Marguerite (H288), 1895
Martaban (H115), 1890
Martaban (H136), 1891
Marthe (O43), 1913
Marz (GY182), 1929
Mastiff (H164), 1891
Mauritius (H547), 1902
Mayfly (H477), 1899
Median (GY384), 1908
Melbourne (H200), 1892
Mercury (H518), 1900
Merrie Islington (H183), 1891
Mikado (H823), 1905
Minerva (H520), 1900
Minoru (GY484), 1909
Miranda (H975), 1906
Mizpah (H56), 1888
Mohican (H391), 1931
Monarch (H331), 1896
Monimia (GY734), 1912
Monimia (H43), 1929
Montreal (H211), 1893
Moravia (GY1018), 1916
Myna (H379), 1912
Narberth Castle (H427), 1898
Narval (O141), 1910
Navena (FD149), 1945
Negro (H406), 1932
Neptune (O126), 1901
Neptunia (H2166), 1926
Nerissa (H879), 1906
Newington (H33), 1899
Night Hawk (GY643), 1911
Nil Desperandum (H66), 1889
Ninus (GY700), 1912
Nodzu (CF1), 1920
Nolsoyar Pall (TN10), 1947
Norman (GY579), 1894
Norman (H249), 1911
Norman (H717), 1902
Norse (H219), 1925
Norse (H348), 1930
North Sea (H147), 1891
Northella (H98), 1958
Northumbria (GY169), 1906
Northward Ho (H455), 1899
Novelli (GY889), 1915
Oberon (H851), 1905
Octavia (H876), 1906
Octavia (H886), 1905
Oliver Cromwell (H490), 1899
Olympia (GY1080), 1917
Olympia (GY62), 1905
Ophir (H725), 1902
Orizaba  (GY356), 1908
Osprey, 1893
Ostrich (H729), 1903
Ostrich (H74), 1899
Othello (H956), 1907
Otterhound (H92), 1890
Ottilie (GY144), 1914
Pamela (H283), 1911
Parthian (GY646), 1911
Pavlova (GY716), 1912
Pelican (H285), 1895
Pelton (H288), 1925
Penelope (H295), 1895
Penguin (H284), 1895
Pentland Firth (H123), 1934
Pericles (H131), 1910
Persian Empire (H476), 1899
Petrel (H222), 1893
Pharos (GY1211), 1900
Philip Maxted (H69), 1889
Phoebe (H881), 1906
Picador (H520), 1933
Pict (H250), 1925
Picton Castle (H194), 1892
Plutarch (H724), 1903
Pointer (H513), 1900
Portia (H280), 1895
Premier (H344), 1896
Pretoria  (H701), 1902
Pretoria (GY180), 1906
Prime Minister (H48), 1888
Prince Charles (H77), 1957
Prince Charles (H85), 1949
Prince Consort (H106), 1890
Prince of Wales (H136), 1891
Prince Philip (H32), 1948
Princess Elizabeth (H135), 1950
Princess Louise (H837), 1905
Princess Marie-José (H242), 1915
Princess Victoria (H766), 1903
Puritan (H497), 1899
Pyrope (H424), 1932
Quail (GY215), 1906
Quebec (H199), 1892
Queen (GY1197), 1900
Queen Alexandra (H530), 1901
Queensland (H212), 1893
Quercia (GY680), 1912
Rado (GY1272), 1903
Raetia (GY707), 1912
Ralco (GY663), 1912
Rameses (GY715), 1894
Rangoon (H45), 1888
Rayon d'Or (GY719), 1912
Rebono (GY731), 1912
Recolo (GY668), 1912
Recordia (H352), 1897
Recordo (GY507), 1910
Recto (GY16), 1904
Refino (GY1271), 1903
Refundo (GY1063), 1917
Regal (GY245), 1930
Reindeer (GY1236), 1902
Relevo (GY670), 1912
Remarko (GY228), 1914
Renco (GY512), 1910
Renovo (GY23), 1904
Renown (GY281), 1907
Reporto (GY380), 1908
Repro (GY510), 1910
Resolute (H52), 1888
Resono (GY508), 1910
Resparko (GY926), 1916
Responso (GY666), 1912
Retriever (H180), 1891
Revello (GY373), 1908
Revello (GY373), 1908
Reverto (GY104), 1904
Rhodesia (H443), 1899
Riano (GY181), 1906
Riby (GY594), 1910
Richard Simpson (H91), 1890
Rifsnes (H451), 1932
Rigoletto (GY185), 1906
Rio Tejo, 1910
Rivière (GY893), 1916
Rodull (GK518), 1948
Roman (H948), 1907
Roman Empire (H431), 1898
Romanoff (GY1204), 1900
Rononia (GY865), 1913
Rosa Maris (FD43), 1920
Rosa Maris (H248), 1920
Rosalind (H839), 1905
Ross (GY329), 1930
Rowsley (GY751), 1912
Royalist (H428), 1898
Royalist (LO50), 1960
Royallieu (GY1191), 1900
Royalo (GY941), 1916
Rubens (O297), 1946
Rugby (GY1188), 1900
Rugby (GY994), 1916
Russell (GY192), 1906
Rylston (H343), 1930
Sabrina (H346), 1897
Salacon (GY55), 1905
Salvini (GY892), 1916
Samuel Hewett (LO117), 1956
San Pedro, 1890
Sandringham (GY59), 1905
Sanson (GY295), 1907
Sargon (GY858), 1913
Sarpedon (GY984), 1916
Satyrion (GY197), 1899
Scarron (GY935), 1913
Scotland (H348), 1897
Sea Horse (H533), 1901
Sea King (H540), 1901
Sea Monarch (H411), 1915
Sea Sweeper (H409), 1915
Seaward Ho (H312), 1915
Seddon (GY991), 1916
Senator (GY61), 1905
Serapion (GY1154), 1899
Seriema (GY504), 1909
Sethon (GY928), 1916
Seti (GY72), 1896
Setter (H163), 1891
Shamrock (H483), 1899
Sheldon (GY696), 1912
Sheraton (GY230), 1907
Siberite (H378), 1931
Sicyon (GY163), 1906
Silanion (GY1179), 1900
Silanion (GY246), 1930
Silicia (GY809), 1913
Simerson (GY960), 1913
Singapore (H505), 1899
Sir Albert Rollit (H55), 1888
Sisapon (GY42), 1905
Sisapon (GY493), 1928
Skuli Fogeti (RE144), 1920
Skuli Magnusson (RE202), 1948
Sledmere (H196), 1892
Sleuth Hound (H114), 1890
Solon (GY326), 1896
Solon (GY714), 1912
Solway Firth (H107), 1929
Somerset Maugham (H329), 1960
Sophron (GY1270), 1903
Sophron (GY58), 1899
Southcoates (H536), 1901
Southella (H303), 1946
Souvenir, 1947
Sparta (H140), 1891
Spartan (GY520), 1893
Springfield (H228), 1893
St  Apollo (H351), 1939
St Achilleus (H127), 1934
St Alcuin (H125), 1950
St Alexandre (H373), 1928
St Amandus (H505), 1933
St Andronicus (H536), 1933
St Apollo (H592), 1948
St Arcadius (H482), 1933
St Attalus (H48), 1934
St Botolph (H188), 1946
St Britwin (H124), 1950
St Cathan (H353), 1936
St Celestin (H192), 1925
St Celestin (H232), 1952
St Chad (H20), 1955
St Clair (H803), 1903
St Crispin (H399), 1946
St Delphine (H380), 1928
St Dominic (H116), 1958
St Donats (H35), 1924
St Elstan (H484), 1937
St Gatien (H189), 1925
St Gerontius (H350), 1961
St Goran (H356), 1936
St Honorious (H66), 1929
St Hubert (H493), 1916
St Irene (H472), 1928
St Ives (H11), 1908
St Joan (H456), 1928
St John (H254), 1946
St Johns (H81), 1910
St Just (H320), 1930
St Kenan (H360), 1936
St Kilda (H355), 1904
St Leander (H420), 1928
St Leger (H178), 1951
St Loman (H156), 1957
St Loman (H381), 1936
St Louis (H153), 1925
St Lucia (H937), 1907
St Malo (H371), 1911
St Matthew (H284), 1946
St Melanthe (H367), 1927
St Michel Bernard, 1946
St Nectan (H411), 1937
St Nidan (H412), 1936
St Romanus (H426), 1928
St Rose (H492), 1928
St Sebastian (H470), 1928
St Vincent (H933), 1907
St Wistan (H486), 1937
St Zeno (H255), 1939
Staghound (H85), 1889
Starella (H219), 1960
Starella (H75), 1949
Stella Aquila (H114), 1956
Stella Leonis (H322), 1960
Stork (H214), 1893
Stork (H498), 1899
Storm Cock (H207), 1892
Stornoway (H83), 1910
Straton (GY208), 1899
Strephon (GY810), 1912
Strephon (GY852), 1898
Stronsay (H387), 1911
Strymon (GY912), 1899
Sutherness (H331), 1914
Swan (H700), 1902
Swanella (H141), 1956
Swanella (H42), 1948
Sweeper (GY853), 1913
Swift (GY674), 1892
Sydney (H202), 1892
Syrian (GY25), 1904
Tanjore (H759), 1903
Tasmania (H122), 1891
Terrier (H171), 1891
Tervani (GY10), 1914
Tervani (H260), 1925
Teuton (GY795), 1898
Thanet (H549), 1902
The Tetrarch (GY945), 1913
Thomas Hamling (H6), 1904
Thora (GY446), 1905
Thorina (H318), 1946
Thornella (H84), 1955
Thornwick Bay (H226), 1935
Thunderstone (GY907), 1913
Thuringia (GY855), 1913
Titan (GY1259), 1903
Tobago (H482), 1899
Topaz (H307), 1896
Tor Bay (H511), 1900
Toronto (H316), 1896
Touraco (GY347), 1908
Tourmaline (H290), 1926
Trier (H153), 1910
Trinidad (H336), 1896
Trygon (FD221), 1908
Tugela (H521), 1900
Tunisian (GY205), 1906
Tunisian (GY319), 1930
Turquoise (H335), 1896
Tuscan (GY82), 1905
Tyndrum (LL375), 1902
Undine (GY204), 1889
Unitia (GY924), 1913
Valeria (H305), 1895
Valesca (GY915), 1916
Valkyrie (H226), 1893
Van der Weyden (O293), 1946
Van Dyck (O298), 1950
Van Eyck (O293), 1951
Van Orley (O294), 1946
Vanguard (H36), 1888
Varanga (GY61), 1929
Vendora (GY466), 1928
Vera (H960), 1907
Victoria (H96), 1890
Victorian (GY1189), 1900
Victrix (H428), 1936
Viking (H451), 1899
Vindelecia (GY954), 1913
Vinur (GY249), 1930
Viola (H868), 1906
Vulture (H470), 1899
Wallena (GY12), 1914
Walpole (GY385), 1931
Walter S Bailey (H546), 1902
Walwyns Castle (H411), 1898
War Duke (GY1037), 1917
War Grey (GY1033), 1916
Warland (GY819), 1912
Warstar (GY73), 1914
Welsbach (H277), 1930
Wessex (GY1231), 1902
Westella (H194), 1959
Westray (H390), 1917
Westray Firth (H125), 1929
Wilberforce (H344), 1897
William Wilberforce (H200), 1959
Windward Ho (H692), 1902
Wolfhound (H141), 1891
Worsley (GY814), 1915
Yorick (H49), 1909
Zebedee (H62), 1889
Zenobia (H110), 1890

Smacks

Ariel (H1473), 1885
Bassanio (H1432), 1885
Eleanor Maria M (GY1036), 1885
Magneta (H1447), 1885
Plover (H1466), 1885
Precursor (H1426), 1885
Unity (H1455), 1885

Drifters
Shields, 1901
Vincit Qui Patitur, 1922

Other commercial vessels 

Tugs

Arcadia, 1895
Conqueror, 1901
Director Gerling, 1892
Empire Dorothy, 1945
Empire Pam, 1945
Empire Peggy, 1945
Englishman, 1889
Forto, 1938
Hereward, 1888
Huntsman, 1902
Irishman, 1896
Kinsman, 1908
Manila, 1895
NER  Number 5, 1922
NER  Number 6, 1923
Plato, 1901
President Ludwig, 1892
Scotsman, 1901
Torfrida, 1889

Humber sloops & keels
Edith, 1893
Rose, 1886

Cargo ships

Empire Maybury, 1945
Empire Mayport, 1945
Farfield, 1921
Hatchmere, 1921
Mickleton, 1921
Redesmere, 1921

Steam yachts
Candace, 1903 - later USS Remlik (SP-157)
Dauntless, 1901
Frances, 1887

Pleasure boats
Boys Own, 1938
Yorkshire Belle, 1938
Yorkshire Belle, 1947
MV Vidas, 1962

Research ships
William Scoresby, 1925 - used in the Discovery Investigations
Other vessels
King Edward, 1902 - later HMCS Laurentian
James Rockbreaker VII, 1938
Whitton No  3, 1897
Whitton No  4, 1897
Shell Farmer, 1955
Tetney, 1909

References

Sources

External links 
Ships Built of Cook Welton And Gemmell
Beverley Shipyard (1953)

Defunct engineering companies of England
British companies established in 1883
Manufacturing companies established in 1883
History of Kingston upon Hull
Defunct shipbuilding companies of England
Companies based in Kingston upon Hull
1883 establishments in England